The Gunfoundry also known as Top ka Sancha (1786 AD) was a cannonball factory set up by the second Nizam of Hyderabad, Nawab Mir Nizam Ali Khan at Fateh Maidan in Hyderabad, India. The historic Aliya High School for Boys and Mehboobia College for Girls, both are opposite to Gunfoundry, across the main road that leads to Abids (in south).

History
The Gunfoundry was one of the several cannon and cannonball factories set up in 1786 AD by French general Michel Raymond who was in the service of Nawab Mir Nizam Ali Khan, the second Nizam of Hyderabad. This is the only surviving gunfoundry established in the 18th century, in the Hyderabad State.

Building Structure
Due to poor maintenance, the tapered walls were reduced to 25 to 30 feet. The lower portion was plastered with lime. The shape of the bricks used in the construction of the structure is square with less thickness. The binding material used is lime mortar. The wall surfaces were covered with lime mortar on the exterior and interior. The walls have joints of square iron rods. In the lower portions, brick arches were made in semi-circular shape, where the smelting was carried out under the supervision of General Raymond.

Authors words
Malcolm's History of India, referred to the foundry in 1798.

References

Defunct firearms manufacturers
History of Hyderabad, India
History of Telangana
Buildings and structures in Hyderabad, India
Artillery of India
Military history of India
Hyderabad State
Defunct manufacturing companies of India